SS Iberia was a steamship built by John Elder & Company and launched in 1873 for the Pacific Steam Navigation Company. She was operated by the Orient Line from 1881 and scrapped in May 1903 at Genoa.

Iberia took part of the New South Wales Contingent to serve in Sudan with British forces as part of the Suakin Expedition, arriving at the Red Sea port of Suakin on 29 March 1885.

References
The Ship List - Pacific Steam Navigation Company
Clyde built ships - Iberia

1873 ships
Ships built on the River Clyde
Steamships of the United Kingdom